The 2014 Asian Taekwondo Championships are the 21st edition of the Asian Taekwondo Championships, and were held at Universal Palace in Tashkent, Uzbekistan from May 26 to May 28, 2014.

Medal summary

Men

Women

Medal table

Team ranking

Men

Women

References
 WTF Ranking July 2014

External links
 WTF Official website

Asian Championships
Asian Taekwondo Championships
Asian Taekwondo Championships
Asian Taekwondo Championships
Taekwondo Championships